Austin Corbett (born September 5, 1995) is an American football guard for the Carolina Panthers of the National Football League (NFL). Corbett played for Reed High School in Sparks, Nevada. Starting as a walk on, he played college football at Nevada.

College career
Before the 2017 season, Corbett had more experience than any other offensive lineman on the Wolf Pack. After the season, he received several team honors including being named the Basalite Big Blocker and a team captain. Following his senior season, Corbett was named as a semifinalist for the 2017 Burlsworth Trophy. He was also invited to the 2018 Senior Bowl.

Professional career

Cleveland Browns
The Cleveland Browns selected Austin Corbett in the second round (33rd overall) of the 2018 NFL Draft. On May 6, Corbett signed a four-year deal worth $7.568 million featuring a $3.584 million signing bonus.

Los Angeles Rams
The Browns traded Corbett to the Los Angeles Rams on October 15, 2019 in exchange for the Rams' fifth-round pick in the 2021 NFL Draft. In 2019, Corbett started in 7 of 8 games after his trade to the Rams. In 2021-22, Corbett started all 17 regular season games. Corbett also started in every playoff game, including Super Bowl LVI, as the Los Angeles Rams went on to win the game 23-20, playing at home, against the Cincinnati Bengals.

Carolina Panthers
On March 16, 2022, Corbett signed a three-year, $26.25 million contract with the Carolina Panthers.

NFL career statistics

Personal life
Corbett is a citizen of the Walker River Paiute Tribe.

References

External links
Nevada Wolf Pack bio
Austin Corbett on Twitter
Cleveland Browns bio

1995 births
Living people
American football offensive guards
Native American players of American football
Northern Paiute people
Sportspeople from Sparks, Nevada
Players of American football from Nevada
Nevada Wolf Pack football players
Cleveland Browns players
Los Angeles Rams players
21st-century Native Americans
Carolina Panthers players